Karl Gustav Johanson Lundell. Born in 1833 in Loppi, Finland. Died 1856.

He has been mistaken as a head workmaster at Fabergé in Odessa. 
New research by Ulla Tillander-Godenhielm has proved, that the mark ГЛ (GL in Russian Cyrillic) is by an unknown master. 
Karl Gustav Johanson Lundell never lived in Odessa nor he was a goldsmith or a master.

References

 H.C. Bainbridge, Peter Carl Fabergé: Goldsmith and Jeweller to the Russian Imperial Court (1966)
 G.von Habsburg-Lothringen & A.von Solodkoff, Fabergé - Court Jeweler to the Tsars (1979) 
 Ulla Tillander-Godenhielm, Fabergén suomalaiset mestarit (Fabergé's Finnish masters)  (2011), p. 261. 

1822 births
1856 deaths
People from Loppi
Finnish silversmiths
Fabergé workmasters